Joy is an international women's magazine, started in 1995 with German language edition. Magazine topics are lifestyle, trends, fashion, beauty, men. Covers usually feature famous actresses, singers and other female entertainers.

In Germany Joy is part of Bauer Media and is published by Marquard on a monthly basis.

Editions
Joy has 9 international editions:
 Germany (since 1995)
Hungary (since 1998)
Serbia (since 2003)
Romania (since 2004)
Czech Republic (since 2005)
Russia (since 2006)
Bulgaria (since 2006)
Ukraine (since 2007)
Indonesia (since 2011)

References

External links
 

1995 establishments in Germany
Bauer Media Group
German-language magazines
Magazines established in 1995
Magazines published in Hamburg
Monthly magazines published in Germany
Women's magazines published in Germany